The Carrollton Covered Bridge, in Barbour County, West Virginia, U.S., is the second longest and third oldest surviving covered bridge in the state. The wooden bridge spans the Buckhannon River near Carrollton and was built in 1856 by Emmet J. O'Brien and Daniel O'Brien. It underwent repairs in 1978 and was added to the National Register of Historic Places on June 4, 1981.

The bridge was heavily damaged in a fire on August 10, 2017.

See also
List of West Virginia covered bridges
List of bridges on the National Register of Historic Places in West Virginia
National Register of Historic Places listings in Barbour County, West Virginia

References

Bridges completed in 1856
Covered bridges on the National Register of Historic Places in West Virginia
Buildings and structures in Barbour County, West Virginia
National Register of Historic Places in Barbour County, West Virginia
Transportation in Barbour County, West Virginia
Tourist attractions in Barbour County, West Virginia
Wooden bridges in West Virginia
Road bridges on the National Register of Historic Places in West Virginia
King post truss bridges in the United States